Parent article: List of DC Comics characters
This is a list of teams and organizations that appear in various DC Comics publications.

Note: Please check :Category:DC Comics superhero teams before adding any redundant entries for superhero teams to the page.

A

Academy of Crime

Academy of Arch-Villains
The Academy of Arch-Villains was a gathering of Wonder Woman villains Angle Man, Human Fireworks, and Mouse Man.

Ace, King, Queen and Jack of Crime

Acme Toys

A.C.R.O.S.T.I.C.

Agency

Agenda

Agony and Ecstasy
Agony and Ecstasy are a duo of enforcers of Hell.

Aerotroopers

Ajan Enterprises

Alien Alliance
There are two versions of the Alien Alliance:

Alien Alliance I

Alien Alliance II

Alleytown Kids

Alliance

Competalian rebels from JLA: Haven

Allies

Alpha Lanterns

All Caste

All-Star Squadron

Altered Strain

Amazon Nation
The Amazon Nation are a hidden female tribe. First appearance: (historic) All-Star Comics #8 (Winter 1941); (current) Wonder Woman (vol. 2) #1 (February 1987).

Amber Butane Corps

Ambush Bug Revenge Squad

American Supreme Men

American Supremacist Party

American Warriors

Angel and the Ape

Anti-Green Lantern Corps

Anti-Justice League

A.P.E.
Short for Allied Perpetrators of Evil, A.P.E. is a supervillain group in The New Adventures of Superman. First appearing in "The Men from A.P.E.", the line-up consists of Lex Luthor, Toyman, Prankster, and Warlock. In "A.P.E. Strikes Back", Lex Luthor and Warlock get back together as A.P.E. with Brainiac as it's new member.

A.P.E.S.
Short for All-Purpose Enforcement Squad.

A.R.G.U.S.

Argent
Argent is a 1950s domestic secret agent team. First appearance: Secret Origins (vol. 3) #14 (May 1987).

Army of Crime

Aryan Brigade

Assassination Bureau

Atari Force

A.T.O.M

Atom Project

Atomic Knights

Authority

Awesome Threesome
The Awesome Threesome are a trio of robots that have antagonized Aquaman. They consist of Claw, Magneto, and Torpedo Man.

Awesome Threesome in other media
The Awesome Threesome appear in The Superman/Aquaman Hour of Adventure. Torpedo Man was first seen in "Treachery is the Torpedo Man". The Awesome Threesome later appear together in "The Torp, the Magneto, and the Claw".

Axis Amerika

Axis World

B

Batman Family

Batman Incorporated

Batmen of All Nations

Batmen Corps

Bear Tribe

Bellatrix Bombers

Biker Babes from Hell

Big Science Action

Birds of Prey

B.I.O.N.
Short for Biologically Integrated Organic Network.

Biospheer Technologies

Bizarro League

Blackhawk Squadron

Black Dragon Society

Black Glove

Black Lantern Corps

Black Seven

Blackrazors

Blasters

Bloch Industries

Blood Brothers

Bloodlines Parasites

Blood Pack

Blood Syndicate

Blue Boys

Blue Lantern Corps

Blue Trinity

Body Doubles

Bombardiers

Bombshells

Boy Commandos

Bravos

Brotherhood of the Bat

Brotherhood of the Cold Flame

Brotherhood of Dada

Brotherhood of Evil

Brotherhood of the Fist

Brute and Glob

Bug and Byte

Bulletman and Bulletgirl

C

Cadre

CAELOSS
CAELOSS is short for The Citizen's Army for the Economic Liberation of Suicide Slum.

Captains of Industry

Captain Atom Brigade

CBI

CIA

C.E.M.A.
C.E.M.A. is short for Cosmic Emergency Management Agency.

Centurions

Chain Gang

Challengers from Beyond

Challengers of the Unknown

Champions of Crime

Champions of Angor

Checkmate

Children of Ares

Children of Cronus
The Children of Cronus are a group of Titans that were responsible for empowering Devastation.

Children of the White Lobe

Church of Superman

Cidermen

Circle

Circle of Fire

Circle of Six

Circus of Strange

Citadel

Citizen's Patrol Corps

Club of Heroes
See Batmen of All Nations

Club of Villains

Coalition of Crime

Combine

Conclave

Conglomerate

Council

Council of Spiders

Corpse Corps

Court of Owls

Creature Commandos

Credo

Crimebusters

Crime Champions

Crime Council

Crime Crusaders Club

Crime Society

Crime Syndicate of America

Crime Syndicate of Qward

Crimson Star Mob

Crusaders

D

Daily Planet

Daily Star

Dark Circle

Dark Men

Dark Nemesis

Dark Trinity

Darkseid's Elite

Darkstars

Dawlakispokpok and Family

Dayton Industries

Death Metal Men

Death Patrol

Death Warriors

Deep Six

Demolition Team

Demons Three
The Demons Three are three demonic brothers consisting of Abnegazar, Ghast, and Rath.

Demons Three in other media
The Demons Three appear in the Justice League Unlimited episode "The Balance" with Abnegazar voiced by Wayne Knight while Ghast and Rath have no dialogue.

Members of the Demons Three appear in Justice League Action with Abnegazar voiced by Damian O'Hare and Rath voiced by Jason J. Lewis. In this show, Abnegazar and Rath are members of the Brothers Djinn alongside Calythos (voiced by David Lodge), Uthool (voiced by Diedrich Bader), and Nyorlath (voiced by Chris Diamantopoulos). Rath appears in "Hat Trick" as a massive demon who gives Felix Faust his youth back.

Department of Extranormal Operations

Devil's Dozen

Deuce and Charger

Digitronix Corporation
Digitronix Corporation is a company in The Hacker Files.

Dingbats of Danger Street

DNAliens

DNAngels

Doom Force

Doom Patrol

Doom Squad

Doomsday Clones

Double Dare

Double Entendre

Duality

E

Eastside Dragons

Easy Company

Elite

Elite Hawkmen

Endless

EuroCrime

Euroguard
Euroguard is a temporary band in Europe created by the JLE and led by Power Girl.

Everyman Project
The Everyman Project was created by Lex Luthor to grant a group of people identities and powers and become part of his incarnation of Infinity, Inc. Recent appearance in 52 #24 (October 18, 2006).

Excalibur Crew
The Excalibur Crew was the shuttle crew that Hank Henshaw was a part of.

Extreme Justice

Extremists

F

Fatal Five

Fearsome Five

Federal Men

Ferrous

Female Furies

First Eleven

Fists of the Guardian

Force of July

Force Family

Forgotten Heroes

Forgotten Villains

Forever People

Four Horsemen of Apokolips

Fourth Reich

Front Men

Freak Show

Freedom Brigade

Freedom Fighters

Frogmen

Futurist Militia

G

Galaxy Communications

Gang

Gardners of the Universe

Gargoyles of Notredame

Gas Gang

Gemma Masters

Gen¹³

Ghost Patrol

Global Guardians

Gotham City Police Department

Gotham City Sirens

Great Ten

Green Arrows of the World

Green Lantern Corps

Green Lantern Corps of Sector 872

Green Lantern Corps Honor Guard

Green Lantern Corps of the Klyminade

Green Team Boy Millionaires

Guardian Angels

Guardians of Metropolis

Guardians of the Universe

Guardians of World Galaxy

Guardians of the Galaxy Elite

Gunner and Sarge
Gunner and Sarge are World War II US Marines. First appearance: Our Fighting Forces #45 (May 1958).

H
The Halla's
Hammer and Sickle - Former members of the People's Heroes from Outsiders #10 (August 1986).
Hammer and Tongs
The Hand - Gang featured in Legionnaires #1 (April 1993).
Hand of Krona - Interstellar technology cult.
Hangmen - Mercenary supervillain team. First appearance: Teen Titans Secret Files and Origins #2 (September 2000).
Haunted Tank Crew
Haven
Hawk and Dove
Hawk Police of Thanagar
Hayoth
Headmen
Helix
Hellenders
Hellfire League of Injustice (Amalgam Comics)
Heroes of Lallor
Hero Hotline
H.I.V.E. (Hierarchy of International Vengeance and Extermination) I and II
H.I.V.E. of the Anti-Matter Universe (Hierarchy for International Virtuous Empowerment)
Hocus and Pocus
Hollow Men
Honor Team of Throne
House of Pain
Human Defense Corps
Hunter's Hellcats - World War II commando unit. First appearance: Our Fighting Forces #106 (April 1967).
H.U.R.R.I.C.A.N.E.
Hybrid
Hyperclan
Hypomen
Hypotheticals

I
Ice Man's Kill Squad
IMHS (The Institute of Metahuman Studies)
Immortals (see New Guardians)
Indigo Tribe
Inferior Five
Infinity Inc.
Injustice Gang
Injustice League I and II
Injustice Society
Injustice Society of the World
Inner Circle
InterC.E.P.T.
Intergang
International Club of Heroes
International Delegation of Masked Archers
International Ultramarine Corps
Interpol 
Interstellar Counter-Intelligence Corps
Invisibles (Vertigo Comics)

J
JLAxis
JLX (Amalgam Comics)
Jokerz (from animated series Batman Beyond)
Judge and Jury
Judgment League Avengers (Amalgam Comics)
The Jury
Just'a Lotta Animals
Justice Alliance of America
Justice Experience
Justice Guild of America (from animated series Justice League)
Justice, Inc.
Justice League Antarctica
Justice League of Aliens
Justice League of Amazons
Justice League of America (JLA) I and II
Justice League of Anarchy
Justice League of Arkham
Justice League of Atlantis
Justice League Detroit
Justice League Elite (also The Elite)
Justice League Europe I and II
Justice League International
Justice League Revenge Squad
Justice League Task Force I and II
Justice Legion Alpha
Justice Lords (see Crime Syndicate)
Justice Society of America (JSA)
Justice Squadron
Justice Underground
Justifiers (see Champions of Angor)

K
KDRA
Kidnoids (Amalgam Comics)
Kents - Family that raised Superman. First appearance: Action Comics #1 (June 1938).
KWHZ (Whiz radio)
Killer Elite
Khandaq
Kobra (also Strike Force Kobra)
Knight & Squire - British masked crimefighters. First appearance: (originals) Batman #62 (January 1951); (new) JLA #26 (February 1999).
Knights of the Galaxy
Knights of Khera
Knights of Knavery
Knights Tempus
Komandi (Elseworlds)
Kryptonian Military Guild

L
Labrats - Genetically altered teenage heroes. First appearance: Labrats #1 (April 2002).
L.A.W.
Lady Blackhawks (The Brave and the Bold TAS)
Lawless League of America
League of Ancients
League Busters
League of Assassins
League of Challenger-Haters
League of Extraordinary Gentlemen (America's Best Comics/Wildstorm)
League of Super-Assassins
League of Superheroes*L.E.G.I.O.N.
Legionnaires
Legion of Doom
Legion of Substitute Heroes
Legion of Super-Heroes
Legion of Super-Pets
Legion of Super-Rejects
Legion of Super-Villains
Legion of the Weird
Leviathan
LexCorp
Leymen
Lex Luthor's Inner Circle
Libra
Linear Men
Locus
Loophole Gang
The Losers I and II

M
Madmen
Mainframe (see Override)
Magnetic Men (Amalgam Comics)
Manhunters
Mankind Liberation Front (MLF) (Elseworlds)
Martian Marauders
Martian Mandrills
Marvel Family
Mas Y Menos (from animated series Teen Titans)
Masters of Disaster
Masters of the Universe
Maximums - A Bizarro team of the Ultimates.
Men from N.O.W.H.E.R.E. - Bizarre secret agents. They can only speak phrases that spell out the acronym "NOWHERE". First appearance: Doom Patrol (vol. 2) #35 (August 1990).
Menagerie - In September 2011, The New 52 rebooted DC's continuity. In this new timeline, during the "Forever Evil" storyline Menagerie is a group led by Cheetah. The group consists of Elephant Man, Hellhound, Lion-Mane IV, Mäuschen, Primape, and Zebra-Man. Steve Trevor and Killer Frost fight them in order to claim Wonder Woman's lasso, which is needed to save the trapped Justice League members from the Firestorm matrix. While Steve Trevor manages to defeat Cheetah, the rest of the Menagerie are frozen by Killer Frost.
The Mercenaries
Merry Men
Meta-Militia
Metal Men
Metallik (see Team Titans)
Metropolis Special Crimes Unit
Micro Squad
Millennium Giants - Guardians of the balance of the Ley Lines. First appearance: The Man of Steel #78 (April 1998).
Minutemen (also Watchmen)
Missile Men
The Misfits - A group of under-rated Batman villains. First appearance: Shadow of the Bat #7 (December 1992).
Monster Society of Evil
Moon Gang (The Brave and the Bold)
Moondancers
Moonlings
The Morrigan
Morte Fatale and the Dead Boys
The Mosaic Kids
Mud Pack
The Mutants (Elseworlds)

N
NASA
National Crime League of America
National Force Crime
The Network - First appearance: World's Finest Comics #311 (January 1985).
Neutralizers
New Blackhawk Air Corps
New Conglomerate
New Extremists
New Gods
New Guardians
The New Hybrids
New Olympians
New Order
Newsboy Legion I and II
New Rogues
The Next
Night and Fog
Night Force
Nightwing and Flamebird
Nuclear Family
Nuclear Legion

O
O.G.R.E.
Ocean Going Resource Exchange
Old Justice
Olympian Gods
Offending Society (Amalgam Comics)
OMAC (One-Man Army Corps)
Omega Men
One Six Seven
Onslaught - Formerly known as the Jihad. A superpowered terrorist team for hire. First appearance: Suicide Squad #1 (May 1987).
Optitron
Orange Lanterns
Order of St. Dumas
The Orishas
The Orthodoxy
Our Ladys of the Shadow University
O.S.O. (Office of Special Operations)
O.S.S. - DC Universe version of the Office of Strategic Services. First appearance: G.I. Combat #192 (July 1976).
Outcasts
Outlaws (Red Hood and the Outlaws)
The Outsiders
The Outsiders (from 1st Issue Special #10)

P
 The Parliament of Decay - A group that is associated with the Black, which is in turn associated with death.
 The Parliament of Flames - A group of fire elementals that reside in the Burn and is associated with an unidentified force which is in turn associated with fire.
 The Parliament of Limbs - A group that is associated with the Red, which is in turn associated with the life force of all of Earth's animal life.
 The Parliament of Stone - A group of Earth elementals that reside in the Melt, which is in turn associated with all types of minerals.
 The Parliament of Trees - A group of plant elementals that reside in the Green, which is in turn associated with the life force of all of Earth's plant life.
 The Parliament of Vapours - A group of air elementals that reside in the White, which is in turn associated with air.
 The Parliament of Waves - A group that reside in the Clear, which is in turn associated with the life force of all of Earth's aquatic life.
 The Pentacle
 People's Heroes
 Planetary (Wildstorm)
 Planeteers (see Tommy Tomorrow) - 22nd century space police force.
 Poglachian Green Lantern Corps
 Point Men - Foes of Young Justice.
 Power Company
 Power Posse
 Primal Force
 Princes of Darkness
 Professionals
 Project Cadmus
 Project Slipshift
 Punch and Jewelee - Duo of jester-themed thieves. First appearance: Captain Atom (vol. 1) #85 (March 1967).
 Purple Trio
 Psyba-Rats - Superpowered teenage hackers. First appearance: Robin Annual #2 (1993).
 Pyre - unrevealed villains made up of fire in Martian Manhunter comics.

Q
Q Society
The Quorum - Rogue American agency.
Quickstart Enterprises
Quinntettes
Quintet
The Quintessence

R
Rainbow Raiders
Ratpack
The Rattles
The Ravens
The Ravers
R.E.B.E.L.S. (Revolutionary Elite Brigade to Eradicate L.E.G.I.O.N. Supremacy)
Rebirth Inc.
RECOMbatants
R.E.C.R.U.I.T.S.
Red Brotherhood
Red Lantern Corps
Red Morgue
Red Shadows (Russian Suicide Squad)
Red Shift
Red Tornado Family
Red Trinity
Redhood and the Outlaws
Relative Heroes
Renegades
Renegades of Mars
Requiem Inc.
The Resistance (Wildstorm)
Revenge Squad (from Batman: Brave and the Bold)
Revenge Syndicate
Revson Cosmetics
Ringers
Robot Renegades
The Rocket-Elite
Rocket Red Brigade
Rocket Rollers
Rogue's Gallery
Royal Guard
Royal Flush Gang
Rydertech

S
The Satan Brothers
Savage Six
Scare Tactics
Scarlet Horde
Schichiriron
Science Council of Krypton
Science Police
The Scissormen
Scorpio
S.C.Y.T.H.E.
Sea Devils
Searchers Inc.
Secret Six I, II, and III
Secret Society of Super Villains
Section 8
Sentinels of Magic
Seraphim
Servants of Darkness
The Seven
Seven Deadly Enemies of Man
Seven Scribes of the Cloudy Satchel
Seven Shadows
Seven Soldiers of Victory I, II, and III
The Sex Men - Bizarre secret agents. First appearance: Doom Patrol (vol. 2)
S.H.A.D.E.
Shadow Cabinet (Milestone Media)
Shadow Fighters
Shadow-Force
Shadowpact
Shadowspire
Shadowstryke
Silicon Dragons
Silk Brothers
Sinestro Corps
Sino-Green Lanterns
Sino-Supermen
Sivana Industries
SKULL
Sky Raiders
S.M.A.S.H. (Society of Modern American Science Heroes) (America's Best Comics)
Snatchers
The Society
Society of Evil
Society of Shadows
Society of Sin (see Brotherhood of Evil)
Society of the Golden Wing
Solar Council
Soldiers of the Red Brotherhood
Sons of Batman (Elseworlds) - Also featured in Batman: Legends of the Dark Knight #21-23 (August – October 1991).
Sons of Liberty - Top secret government organization.
Sovereign Seven
Soyuz
Space Canine Patrol Agents (also Dog Star Patrol)
Space Legion
Space Marine Corps
Space Voyagers
Special Crimes Unit
Speed Boys
Speed Metal
S.P.I.D.E.R.
Spirit of America
Stanley and His Monster
S.T.A.R. Labs (Scientific and Technological Advanced Research Laboratories)
S.T.A.R. Corps
Starbrand Corps (Amalgam Comics)
Star Hunters
Star Riders
Star Rovers
Star Sapphires
Stars and S.T.R.I.P.E.
Steelworks
Stormwatch
StormWatch (Wildstorm)
Strikeforce
Strike Force Kobra
Subterraneans
Suicide Squad I, II, and III (also Task Force X)
Super Buddies
Super Friends
Super Malon
Super-Sons
Super Squad
Super Young Team
Superior Five
Superman Family
Superman Revenge Squad
Superman Robots
Supermen of America
Supermen of the Multiverse
Spyral

T
T-Men
Task Force Delta
Task Force X I and II
Tartarus
Taurus Gang
Team 7
Team 7 (Wildstorm), see also Team Zero
Team Luthor
Team Superman
Team Turmoil
Team Titans
Teen Titans
Tenth Circle
Terrible Three (Amalgam Comics)
Terrible Trio
Terrific Trio
Terror Firma
Terror Twins
 Thundercats (Wildstorm)
Tuesday Club
Three Aces
Thrrll and Brrmm
Thunder and Lightning
Thunderers of Qward
Jakeem Thunder and Thunderbolt
Time Foes
Time Masters
Tiny Titans (Johnny DC Imprint)
Titans Army
Titans East
Titans West
Titans of Myth - Precursors of the Olympian Gods. First appearance: New Teen Titans (vol. 1) #11 (June 1981).
TNT and Dan the Dyna-Mite
TNT Trio
Tomahawk's Rangers
Tornado Twins
Trenchcoat Brigade
The Tribune
Trigger Twins I and II
Trinity
Triple Threat
Triumvirate of Hell
Tyrranoids of Latkovia (Amalgam Comics)

U
Uh-oh Squad
Ultragen Corporation
Ultimen - Based on Super Friends; from the animated series Justice League Unlimited.
Un-People (Amalgam Comics)
Un-Men
Uncanny Amazers
Underground Society
Underworlders
Unit Three
United Planets
Université Notre Dame des Ombres
Untouchables
Uranus/Gaea Corporation

V
Vandermeer University
Vanguard
Van Horn Industries
Vendetta
Vigilance Inc. (also known as Searchers Inc.)
Villains United
Villainy Inc.
VULTURE

W
Warlord Family
Wayne Tech
Wanderers
Warlords of Okaara
Watchmen
Weaponers of Qward
Weaponers of A.I.M. (Amalgam Comics)
WEB (Impact Comics)
Webhost
White Lantern Corps
Wildebeest Society
WildC.A.T.S. (Wildstorm)
Wingmen of Thanagar
Wolf Pack
Wonder Twins
Workforce
Wotan and the Wildhunt - Featured in Manhunter #0.
Wreckers
Wurstwaffe

X
X-League (Amalgam Comics)
Xenobrood
X Justice
X Inc.

Y
Yakuza
Yellow Lanterns (see Sinestro Corps)
Yellow Peril
Young Allies
Young All-Stars
Young Heroes
Young Justice

Z
Z-1 Missile-Men
Zod Squad
Zombi Twins
Zoo Crew

See also
 DC Universe
 List of DC Comics characters
 List of DC Comics publications
 List of alien races in DC Comics
 List of criminal organizations in DC Comics
 List of government agencies in DC Comics
 List of Justice League members
 List of Legion of Super-Heroes members

References

 DC Comics teams and organizations, List of
 
 DC Comics teams and organizations, List of